The 1996 United States Senate election in Wyoming was held November 5, 1996. Incumbent Republican U.S. Senator Alan K. Simpson decided to retire. Republican nominee Mike Enzi won the open seat.

Democratic primary

Candidates
 Kathy Karpan, former Secretary of State of Wyoming and 1994 Democratic nominee for Wyoming Governor
 Mickey Kalinay

Results

Republican primary

Candidates
 Mike Enzi, state senator
 John Barrasso, orthopedic surgeon
 Curt Meier, state senator
 Nimi McConigley, state representative
 Kevin Meenan, Natrona County District Attorney
 Kathleen P. Jachkowski, motivational speaker
 Brian E. Coen
 Cleveland B. Holloway
 Russ Hanrahan

Results

General election

Candidates
 Mike Enzi (R), Wyoming State Senator
 David Herbert (L)
 Kathy Karpan (D), former Secretary of State of Wyoming and 1994 Democratic nominee for governor
 Lloyd Marsden (NL)

Results

See also 
 1996 United States Senate elections

References 

Wyoming
1996
1996 Wyoming elections